Heeremans is a Dutch surname. Notable people with the surname include:

Jean Heeremans (1914–1970), Belgian fencer
Karl Heeremans (1937–2010), Belgian artist
Thomas Heeremans (1641–1694), Dutch painter and art dealer

Dutch-language surnames